Gateway Discovery Park is a  public park in northeast Portland, Oregon. The park was acquired in 2009, and opened in 2018.

References

External links

 

2018 establishments in Oregon
Northeast Portland, Oregon
Parks in Portland, Oregon